The Singapore Underground Road System, SURS (Chinese: 地下道路系统; Malay: Sistem Jalan Bawah Tanah Singapura) was a proposed road underground system in Singapore. The project comprised two 15 km-long, 2-4 lane concentric ring tunnels around the central business district, with 8 interchanges and 33 entrances and exits. The capital cost was estimated to be at $2.4 billion with a construction period of 15 years. The project was first considered in the 1980s and was seen as a way to cater for increasing traffic growth in and out of the city centre.

On 29 August 2017, the Land Transport Authority (LTA) scrapped this project as part of a shift to a car-lite society. This comes after enhancements to the Mass Rapid Transit (MRT) network and changes to land use policies over the years since the project's conceptualisation. As a result, land safeguarded for the project since 1993 was freed up for other developmental purposes, allowing for greater flexibility by developers.

References 

2017 disestablishments in Singapore
Transport in Singapore
Downtown Core (Singapore)
Kallang
Novena, Singapore